Yaser Yıldız (born June 1, 1988 in Adapazarı, Turkey) is a Turkish footballer who plays as a forward for Vanspor. He scored the finishing goal against Bellinzona what ended 2–1 win for Galatasaray in first round UEFA Cup.

Honours
 Galatasaray
 Turkish Super Cup: 1 (2008)

Career statistics

References

External links
 
 

1988 births
Living people
Sportspeople from Adapazarı
Turkish footballers
Süper Lig players
TFF First League players
TFF Second League players
Sakaryaspor footballers
Denizlispor footballers
Kartalspor footballers
Galatasaray S.K. footballers
Manisaspor footballers
Boluspor footballers
Adanaspor footballers
Pendikspor footballers
Ümraniyespor footballers
Sarıyer S.K. footballers
Utaş Uşakspor footballers
Turkey youth international footballers
Association football midfielders
Association football forwards